Chell may refer to:

 Chell, Staffordshire, an English community on the northern edge of Stoke-on-Trent
 Chell (Star Trek), a Star Trek: Voyager character
 Chell (Portal), the protagonist in the Portal video games
 CHemical cELL, in the context of bottom-up synthetic biology

People 
 Carol Chell (born 1941), British children's television presenter
 Joseph Chell (1911–1992), British footballer

See also 
 Cheal (disambiguation)